Count Henry II of Nassau-Siegen (7 January 1414 – 18 January 1451), official titles: Graf zu Nassau, Vianden und Diez, Herr zu Breda, was since 1442 Count of Nassau-Siegen (a part of the County of Nassau), of Vianden and of half Diez. He descended from the Ottonian Line of the House of Nassau.

Biography

Henry was born on 7 January 1414 as the second son of Count Engelbert I of Nassau-Siegen and Lady Joanne of Polanen. Already on 18 May 1415, a contract was made for his first marriage, allocating Vianden, St. Vith and Bütgenbach to him.

Count of Nassau-Siegen, Vianden and Diez
However, the County of Vianden had already been assigned to Henry by the marriage contract on 18 May 1415. In that same year 1442, Roman King Frederick III granted Henry (his share of) the land of Cleves, the County of Mark, the land of Dinslaken (Diesbach) and (half of) the County of Diez as fiefs. Also in that year, Henry, his brother John and their distant cousin Count  were granted Greifenstein Castle as a fief and a part of the proceeds from the toll in Lahnstein. Together with his brother, Henry inherited the property of their uncle Count John II ‘with the Helmet’ in 1443. On 20 January 1445, Henry was granted the County of Vianden as a fief by Archbishop  of Cologne. On 22 February 1447 Henry and his brother John divided their possessions, whereby Henry obtained the possessions in Germany as well as ¾ of the County of Vianden.

Dispute over the County of Diez
On 2 July 1420, Henry’s father and Count Godfrey VII of Eppstein-Münzenberg transferred the County of Diez, which they jointly owned and which was a imperial fief, to Archbishop  of Trier, and received it back from him as a fief. On 27 July 1441, Roman King Frederick III informed Archbishop  of Tier, that with the charter of 2 July 1420 he had proved that Engelbert and Godfrey had transferred the imperial fief of the County of Diez to Archbishop Otto and received it as a fief. On 30 July 1441, Frederick ordered Engelbert and Count Godfrey VIII of Eppstein-Münzenberg to accept the County of Diez as a fief from Archbishop James.

On the same day the King informed Henry and Godfrey that he had granted Archbishop James the County of Diez as a fief together with all its appurtenances. Thereafter they and their heirs were to receive the county from Archbishop James as a fief, as they and their ancestors had had it as a fief from the Roman Emperors and Kings until now. The king ordered Henry and Godfrey and their heirs to receive and possess the said county and its appurtenances from Archbishop James and his successors, to behave in accordance with the obligations of their fathers and to send Archbishop James for himself and his heirs charters about it. Then he released them from all feudal obligations with which they were bound to the king and the empire because of the said county, and decreed that in case of violation the county or the part of it which the violator possessed, would revert to James, his successors and the Electorate of Trier.

On 30 June 1442 James invited Henry to St. Maximin’s Abbey on 15 July to settle their dispute. Henry requested on 7 July a ‘waer affschryfft’ (true copy) of his father’s charter to Archbishop Otto. On 13 July Jacob sent a letter from Frederick III, in which the latter confirmed the sealed charter of 1420, to Henry. On 30 August 1442, Frederick appointed Count palatine Louis IV as a judge to act as the king’s deputy in the dispute between Henry and James, to summon and interrogate the disputing parties and to reach a reconciliation. In the event that a settlement did not succeed, Louis was authorised to come to a judgment. The king stipulated that Louis’ decision would be valid in the same way as his own. In a letter from Louis to James dated 16 August 1443, not only Henry but also his brother John IV and their uncle John II are mentioned as opponents of the archbishop. Henry and John IV complained to James on 20 October 1443 about pledges by him ‘in onser erebschafft’ (in our inheritance). In his answer of 2 November 1443 James referred both counts to the court day planned by Louis.

A solution was apparently not reached there, because on 6 October 1444, following a complaint by James against Henry and John about the counties of Nassau and Diez and other fiefs, Frederick appointed Archbishop Dietrich of Mainz, as judge and gave him power of attorney to schedule a trial between the two parties on his behalf, and then to render a judgment. The king again stipulated that Dietrich’s decision would be valid in the same way as a decision of his own, and exhorted the archbishop to let justice take its course even in the event one of the parties did not appear at the hearing. Dietrich’s verdict is unknown.

On 24 July 1451 Frederick granted James, because Henry and Godfrey had not received the County of Diez from James, although more than a year and a day had elapsed since the royal letter was proclaimed to them, and also because Godfrey had pledged his share of the county without the King’s and archbishop’s consent, all the rights that had reverted to the King and the kingdom on account of the failure to take it as a fief and the pledging. Finally, on 4 November, James granted Henry’s brother and heir John the county as a fief.

Death and burial

In connection with the Jubilee proclaimed by Pope Nicholas V for 1450, Henry undertook a pilgrimage to Rome. On the journey back, he died on 18 January 1451 at Radicofani in Tuscany, about 30 km north of Lake Bolsena. Sources mention both plague and malaria as possible causes of death. Henry was buried in the Collegiata (a collegiate church where the daily office of worship is maintained by a college of canons) in the small city of San Quirico d'Orcia, located about 25 km north of Radicofani. It is obvious to assume that Henry was on his way to Siena, about 25 km north of San Quirico d'Orcia, to make his appearance before King Frederick III. It was in Siena that the first so-called meeting of Portugal took place on 8 February 1451. That marriage between Frederick III and Princess Eleonor of Portugal had been mediated by the Bishop of Siena, Eneas Silvio Piccolomini, who later became Pope Pius II.

The heavily worn tombstone shows in bas-relief a warrior in armour (chain mail, sword and dagger), except for the head, whose luxuriant hair is covered with a beret instead of a helmet. His feet rest on a lion. Of the original edge lettering, only a few words are still partly readable. At the foot end two coats of arms, which are completely worn. Henry’s subjects from the city of Diez are said to have commissioned the tombstone. The coats of arms, which must have represented the coat of arms of Henry and that of his second consort, have a less usual shape, i.e. semicircular at the top and tapered at the bottom. This shape did occur in Italy in the 15th century. This could indicate that the citizens of Diez commissioned the tombstone to be made in Italy.

In order to prevent further wear of the tombstone, an unusual solution was chosen: the tombstone was bricked into the wall horizontally, i.e. with the long side resting on the floor. This may have been done as early as the 18th century. Later, they did not even refrain from building a wall against the head-end as a support for the stairs to a new pulpit, which was closed by an iron gate that conveniently was hammered into the tombstone. This is how a Dutch visitor found the tombstone in 1928, who complained that the unfortunate arrangement made it difficult to take a proper photograph of the tombstone. Nothing was known about the person depicted. According to local tradition, a certain Count of Nassau died at Radicofani and was interred in this church at his own request. The aforementioned visitor, however, was able to find the original text of the epitaph in the church archives, which read as follows: ‘HENRICO GERMANICO NASSOVII VIANDENII DIETCEQUE COMITI ILLUSTRI A JUBILEO REDEUNTI SACRUM OBIIT XV KAL FEBRUARII MCCCCLI’ (English translation: ‘Dedicated to the illustrious German Count Henry of Nassau, Vianden and Diez died on the return journey from the Jubilee 18 January 1451’).

The undignified fiddling with the tombstone was ended during a restoration of the church in 1936 by removing it from the wall and laying it flat in the floor again. During a new restoration in 1946, necessary due to repair of war damage sustained in June 1944, a skeleton ‘de grande proportioni’ was found in the choir, which is believed to be the remains of Henry. Ten years later, at the insistence of the then Apostolic Internuncio in The Hague, a partition was made around the tombstone with a red cord. The completely faded Latin inscription with Italian translation was also applied to the wall above the tombstone.

Marriages and issue

First marriage
Henry married in 1435 to Countess Genoveva of Virneburg (? – Breda, 18 April 1437), daughter of Count Rupert IV of Virneburg and his second wife Countess Agnes of Solms-Braunfels. The marriage contract was already approved by Duchess Elizabeth of Luxembourg on 15 May 1429. Genoveva was buried in Breda.
From the marriage of Henry and Genoveva only one daughter was born:
 Ottilie (before or on 18 April 1437 – July 1493), married:
 in 1449/1450 to Count Philip ‘the Younger’ of Katzenelnbogen (1427 – 27 February 1453).
 on 3 June 1475 to Count Oswald I of Tierstein ( – before 1488). Oswald was governor in the Alsace, the Sundgau and the Breisgau and councillor in Lorraine and the Electorate of Cologne.

Second marriage
Henry remarried in 1440 to Lady Irmgard of Schleiden-Junkerath (? – after 1450), daughter of Lord John III of Schleiden-Junkerath and Countess Joanne of Blankenheim. The second marriage remained childless.

Ancestors

Notes

References

Sources
 
 
 
 
 
 
 
 
 
 
 
  (1882). Het vorstenhuis Oranje-Nassau. Van de vroegste tijden tot heden (in Dutch). Leiden: A.W. Sijthoff/Utrecht: J.L. Beijers.

External links

 Nassau. In: Medieval Lands. A prosopography of medieval European noble and royal families, by Charles Cawley.
 Nassau Part 4. In: An Online Gotha, by Paul Theroff.

|-

Nassau-Siegen, Henry 02
Nassau-Siegen, Henry 02
Counts of Nassau
Counts of Diez
Counts of Vianden
House of Nassau-Siegen
Lords of Breda
Nassau-Siegen, Henry 02